The Women's 10m Air Pistol SH1 shooting event at the 2004 Summer Paralympics was competed  on 19 September. It was won by Isabel Newstead MBE, representing .

Preliminary

19 Sept. 2004, 12:15

Final round

19 Sept. 2004, 15:15

References

W
Para